Sanphebagar Airport  is a domestic airport located in Sanphebagar serving Achham District, a district in Sudurpashchim Province in Nepal.

History 
In 1967, the Airport was first constructed only having a Grass/Clay runway. It came into operation in 1975.

In February 2002, the terminal building and the airport's Control tower  was destroyed in a Maoist attack. It was restored and upgraded and reopened for operations in 2018.

Facilities 

Airlines and destinations

Currently, there are no scheduled services to and from Sanphebagar Airport. In 2019, Nepal Airlines briefly operated routes to Nepalgunj.

References

Airports in Nepal
1967 establishments in Nepal
Buildings and structures in Achham District